= Heracleon of Egypt =

Ancient grammarian

Heracleon of Egypt (Ancient Greek: Ἡρακλέων; also spelled Herakleon), also known as Heracleon of Tilotis, was an ancient Greek grammarian from the village of Tiloteus or Tilotis in Egypt, which belonged to the Heracleopolis. He taught in Rome, probably in the period of the Augustus, and is known to have written a commentary on Homer, organized by rhapsody. In addition, he authored works on the lyric poets and a treatise titled On the Imperative Verbs in Homer (Περὶ τῶν παρ' Ὁμήρῳ προστακτικῶν ῥημάτων). He is mentioned in the Suda encyclopedia. His works were later summarized by the grammarian Didymus Claudius, although some scholars suggest that he may have been referring instead to Heracleon of Ephesus.
